Rubus vulcanicola is an uncommon Central American species of brambles in the rose family. It has been found only in Panamá and Costa Rica. The species was initially discovered on the sides of Volcán Poas in Costa Rica.

Rubus vulcanicola is a prickly perennial. Leaves are compound with 3 or 5 leaflets. Flowers are pink or rose-colored. Fruits are black.

References

External links
photo of herbarium specimen at Missouri Botanical Garden, collected in Panama in 1938

vulcanicola
Flora of Panama
Flora of Costa Rica
Plants described in 1897